Capu Piscului may refer to several villages in Romania:

 Capu Piscului, a village in Godeni Commune, Argeș County
 Capu Piscului, a village in Merișani Commune, Argeș County